Countach may refer to:

Vehicles
 Lamborghini Countach (1974-1990), a production supercar from Lamborghini
 Lamborghini Countach LPI 800-4 (2022), a limited-production sportscar from Lamborghini
 Lamborghini Countach QVX (1985), a Group-C racecar

Music

Albums
 Countach (album), a 2008 album by 'The Cassettes'
 Countach (For Giorgio), a 2016 album by 'Shooter Jennings'

Songs
 "Countach" (song), a 2018 song by Jean Rodríguez off the album Coastcity
 "Countach" (song), a 2016 song by 'Shooter Jennings' off the album Countach (For Giorgio)
 "Countach" (song), a 2015 song by Ratatat off the album Magnifique (album)
 "Countach" (single), a 2008 single by 'W&W'; see W&W discography
 "Countach" (song), a 2005 song by "Franz & Shape" off the 2006 'Soulwax' album This Is Radio Soulwax

Other uses
 Countach (2004–2012), a Japanese manga serialized comic by Haruto Umezawa

See also

 Lamborghini V12, the engine from the Countach (1974-1990) referred to as the Countach engine
 "The County Countach", nickname of Jordan Brown (snooker player)